Isodactylactis is a genus of cnidarians belonging to the family Cerianthidae.

Species:

Isodactylactis affinis 
Isodactylactis borealis 
Isodactylactis discors 
Isodactylactis elegans 
Isodactylactis kempi 
Isodactylactis obscura 
Isodactylactis praecox 
Isodactylactis tardiva

References

Cerianthidae
Anthozoa genera